is the blackboard bold letter B. It can refer to:
 The -dimensional ball 
 A Boolean domain